Drohan is a surname. Notable people with the surname include:

Eddie Drohan (1876–1938), Australian rules footballer
Frank Drohan (1879–1953), Irish politician
Ian Drohan (1932–2019), Australian rules footballer
Kate Drohan (born 1973), American softball head coach and former collegiate player
Tom Drohan (1887–1926), American baseball player